Lampang Football Club (Thai: สโมสรฟุตบอลจังหวัดลำปาง) is a Thai  professional association football club based in Lampang Province. The club plays in Thai League 1.

Timeline
History of events of Lampang Football Club

Stadium and locations

Season by season record

Players

{{FS
Player|no=66|nat=THA|pos=DF|name=P
antakan Kasemkulwirai]]}}

Club Staff

Honours

Domestic leagues
Regional League Northern Division
 Winners (1): 2015

References

External links
 

2022-23
Thai League 1 clubs
Football clubs in Thailand
Sport in Lampang province
 
Association football clubs established in 2010
Lampang province
2010 establishments in Thailand